The  1907 Washington University football team represented Washington University in St. Louis as a member of the newly-formed Missouri Valley Conference (MVC) during the 1907 college football season. Led by J. Merrill Blanchard in his second and final season as head coach, the team compiled an overall record of 1–5–1 with a mark of 0–1 in conference play, placing last out of five teams in the MVC. Washington University played home games in St. Louis at Washington University Stadium, which was renamed as Francis Field in October 1907, and is now known as Francis Olympic Field.

Schedule

References

Washington University
Washington University Bears football seasons
Washington University football